The South Africa national under-20 football team, is a youth football (soccer) team, which represents South Africa and is controlled by the South African Football Association, the governing body for football in South Africa. The team's main objectives are to qualify and play at the African Youth Championship and FIFA U-20 World Cup. The team has played at seven African Youth Championships and three FIFA U-20 World Cups.

History
The team was started in 1993, when SAFA decided to form an under-20 team. The team's greatest achievements to date include a second-place finish at the 1997 African Youth Championship, hosted in Morocco and qualifying for the 1997, 2009 and 2017 FIFA U-20 World Cup and 2019 FIFA U-20 World Cup.

Player eligibility
Players who are selected, will be 20 or younger in the following World Cup year. With the next FIFA U-20 World Cup being held in Poland in 2019, players need to have been born on or after 1 January 1999.

Schedule and recent results

The following is a list of matches from the past twenty-four months, as well as any future matches that have been scheduled.

Current squad
The following 21 players are selected for the 2019 FIFA U-20 World Cup to be held in Poland between 23 May  – 15 June 2019.

Notable former players
Players who have previously played for the under-20 team, and have since gone on to play for the senior team:

Benni McCarthy
Matthew Booth
Thulani Serero
Stanton Fredericks
Thulani Hlatshwayo
Darren Keet
Andile Jali
Junaid Hartley

Tournament records

FIFA U-20 World Cup record

Africa U-20 Cup of Nations record

COSAFA U-20 Challenge Cup record

References

External links
South Africa FA official website

African national under-20 association football teams
Soccer